Samaspur Majra is a large village located in Jhajjar district in the Indian state of Haryana.

Demographics
In 2011, The Kasni village has population of 2370 of which 1301 are males while 1069 are females.

Religion
Majority of the residents are Hindu.

See also 
 Sarola
 Girdharpur, Jhajjar
 Khudan
 Chhapar, Jhajjar
 Dhakla, Jhajjar

References 

Villages in Jhajjar district